Offspring is the product of biological reproduction.

Offspring may also refer to:

Music 
 The Offspring, an American rock band 
 "The Offspring" (album), their debut album

Arts, entertainment, and media

Television 
 Offspring (TV series), an Australian drama series
 "Offspring", a 2001 episode of the supernatural drama series Angel
 "The Offspring" (Star Trek: The Next Generation), a 1990 episode of the science fiction series Star Trek: The Next Generation

Films 
 Offspring (1996 film), an Australian thriller directed by Richard Ryan
 Offspring (2009 film), also known as Jack Ketchum's Offspring, a 2009 horror film

Other uses 
 Offspring (character), a character from the DC Comics universe
 Offspring (radio), an early version of the BBC Radio 4 programme Home Truths
 "The Offspring", alternate name for 1987 American anthology horror film From a Whisper to a Scream (film)
 Ofspring Blackall (1655–1716), Bishop of Exeter